The canton of Cabourg is an administrative division of the Calvados department, northwestern France. Its borders were modified at the French canton reorganisation which came into effect in March 2015. Its seat is in Cabourg.

Composition

It consists of the following communes:

Amfreville
Angerville
Annebault
Auberville
Basseneville
Bavent
Bourgeauville
Branville
Bréville-les-Monts
Brucourt
Cabourg
Cresseveuille
Cricqueville-en-Auge
Danestal
Dives-sur-Mer
Douville-en-Auge
Dozulé
Gonneville-en-Auge
Gonneville-sur-Mer
Goustranville
Grangues
Hérouvillette
Heuland
Houlgate
Merville-Franceville-Plage
Périers-en-Auge
Petiville
Putot-en-Auge
Ranville
Saint-Jouin
Saint-Léger-Dubosq
Saint-Vaast-en-Auge
Sallenelles
Varaville

Councillors

Pictures of the canton

References

Cantons of Calvados (department)